Eagle Harbor is a harbor on the east side of Bainbridge Island, Washington. It is the harbor where the Seattle–Bainbridge Island ferry service operates at the island's main town of Winslow. Washington State Ferries has a shipbuilding and maintenance facility in Eagle Harbor near the ferry terminal that it has used since 1951. The harbor has been home to various shipbuilding companies since the early 20th century.

References

Bainbridge Island, Washington